The Coomalie Community Government Council is a local government area in Australia's Northern Territory, situated south of Darwin and Palmerston. The shire had a population of 1,391 in June 2018.

History
Coomalie Community Government Council was established on 7 December 1990, and its first elections were held in 1997. On 1 July 2008, Coomalie Council became one of the 11 Shires in the territory, changed by the Northern Territory Government.

Wards
The council is divided up into six wards, which are governed by 9 councillors:
Batchelor Township Ward (3) (Batchelor)
Adelaide River Township Ward (2) (Adelaide River)
Batchelor Rural Ward (1)
Adelaide River Rural Ward (1)
Lake Bennett Ward (1) (Lake Bennett)
Coomalie/Tortilla Ward (1)

Townships
The Shire includes the following localities:

 Adelaide River
 Batchelor
 Camp Creek
 Collett Creek
 Coomalie Creek
 Darwin River Dam	
 Eva Valley	
 Finniss Valley	
 Lake Bennett
 Rum Jungle
 Stapleton
 Tortilla Flats

The boundary of this area extends from the Manton Dam in the north, to the town of Adelaide River in the south and east from the Adelaide River, to the Litchfield National Park in the west.

See also
 Local government areas of the Northern Territory

References

External links
LGWORKS:  Coomalie Community Government Council 

Coomalie